Joseph Cooper Inman, Jr. (born November 29, 1947) is an American professional golfer who has played on the PGA Tour and the Champions Tour.

Amateur career 
Inman was born in Indianapolis, Indiana and is the eldest of six children.  After graduating in 1965 from Grimsley High School in Greensboro, North Carolina, he attended Wake Forest University in Winston-Salem, North Carolina and was a distinguished member of the golf team – a three-time All-American (first-team his senior year). He graduated in 1970 and turned pro in 1972 shortly after marrying Nancy Craig of Columbia, South Carolina.

Professional career 
Inman attempted to make the PGA Tour at 1972 PGA Tour Qualifying School. However, he was unsuccessful. The following year, however, he was successful at 1973 PGA Tour Qualifying School.

Inman played on the PGA Tour from 1974 to 1986. He made the top 60 in the money list in his first year, 1974, the barometer to determine full-time exemption. He won one event during this phase of his career, the 1976 Kemper Open. His best finish in a major was T-9 at The Masters in 1978. After he retired from the PGA Tour, he worked as a sales representative for Ping from 1989 to 1997; he became eligible for the Champions Tour upon reaching the age of 50 in November 1997.

Inman spent his regular PGA Tour years largely toiling in relative obscurity, but immediately became one of the stars on the Champions Tour by winning  the 1998 Pacific Bell Senior Classic in his first year. He won the event three years in a row (it was called the SBC Classic the third year), and became only the 5th player in Champions Tour history to three-peat an event. He won the 1998 Senior Tour Rookie of the Year award. Inman has over 4.2 million dollars in Champions Tour career earnings.

Inman became the head coach for the Georgia State University men's golf team in 2008.

Inman lives in Marietta, Georgia with his wife Nancy. They have three children: Joseph Craig, Sally Anne, and Katherine Craig, each of whom attend or have attended Wake Forest. His younger brother, John, was a two-time winner on the PGA Tour and 1984 NCAA Champion.

Amateur wins
1969 North and South Amateur
1970 North Carolina Amateur

Professional wins (5)

PGA Tour wins (1)

Other wins (1)
1968 Carolinas Open (as an amateur)

Senior PGA Tour wins (3)

Senior PGA Tour playoff record (0–1)

Results in major championships

CUT = missed the half-way cut
"T" = tied

U.S. national team appearances
Amateur
Walker Cup: 1969 (winners)

See also 

 1973 PGA Tour Qualifying School graduates

References

External links

American male golfers
Wake Forest Demon Deacons men's golfers
PGA Tour golfers
PGA Tour Champions golfers
Golfers from Indiana
Golfers from Georgia (U.S. state)
Sportspeople from Indianapolis
Sportspeople from Marietta, Georgia
Grimsley High School alumni
1947 births
Living people